Wheeldon is a surname, and may refer to
 Alice Wheeldon (1866–1919), British political activist
 Christopher Wheeldon (born 1973), British choreographer
 Jay Wheeldon (born 1989), English footballer
 John Wheeldon (1929–2006), Australian politician
 Philip William Wheeldon OBE (1913–1992), Anglican bishop
 Scott Wheeldon (born 1986), British rugby player
 Simon Wheeldon (born 1966), Canadian ice hockey player
 Tommy Wheeldon Jr. (born 1979), English football coach
 William Wheeldon (1898–1960), British co-operator, municipal politician and M.P.

See also
 High Wheeldon, a hill in the Peak District, England.